Cassim Louis (13 September 1948 – 7 January 2021), also known as Vaso, was a Saint Lucian football manager.

He was in control of the national team during the 2002 FIFA World Cup qualification campaign where Saint Lucia lost out to Suriname on penalties in the first round. He co-coached the national team with Kingsley Armstrong in 2002.

Louis coached the Under-15 team at the 2013 CONCACAF Under-15 Championship, two years later he led the Under-17 team at the 2015 CONCACAF U-17 Championship.

Louis also coached the Under-20 team at the 2017 CONCACAF U-20 Championship qualifying campaign.

References 

1948 births
2021 deaths
Saint Lucian football managers
Saint Lucia national football team managers
People from Castries Quarter